The 2017–18 Evansville Purple Aces men's basketball team represented the University of Evansville during the 2017–18 NCAA Division I men's basketball season. The Purple Aces, led by 11th-year head coach Marty Simmons, played their home games at the Ford Center as members of the Missouri Valley Conference. They finished the season 17–15, 7–11 in MVC play to finish in a three-way tie for seventh place. As the No. 8 seed in the MVC tournament, they lost to Northern Iowa in the first round.

On March 13, 2018, Evansville fired head coach Marty Simmons. He finished at Evansville with an 11-year record of 184–175. On March 22, the school hired Boston Celtics assistant coach, former Kentucky player and Evansville native Walter McCarty as head coach.

Previous season
The Purple Aces finished the 2016–17 season 16–17, 6–12 to finish in eighth place in MVC play. They defeated Indiana State in the MVC tournament before losing to Illinois State in the quarterfinals.

Offseason

Departures

Incoming transfers

2017 recruiting class

Preseason 
In the conference's preseason poll, the Aces were picked to finish in ninth place in the MVC. Junior guard Ryan Taylor was named to the preseason All-MVC second team.

Roster

Schedule and results

|-
!colspan=9 style=| Non-conference regular season

|-
!colspan=12 style=| Missouri Valley regular season

|-
!colspan=12 style=| Missouri Valley tournament

Source

References

Evansville Purple Aces men's basketball seasons
Evansville
Evansville
Evansville